Close to the Enemy is a British period drama miniseries set in the late 1940s in London. It is written and directed by Stephen Poliakoff, starring Jim Sturgess, Freddie Highmore, Charlotte Riley, Phoebe Fox, Alfred Molina, Ciara Charteris, Lindsay Duncan, August Diehl, Alfie Allen, Angela Bassett, Antje Traue, Lucy Ward, Sebastian Armesto, Julian Bleach, Charity Wakefield, Aleksandar Jovanovic, and Robert Glenister. It premiered in the United Kingdom on BBC Two on 10 November 2016.

Summary
Just after World War II ends, Dieter Koehler, a German engineer who specialised in jet aeroplane technology, is seized along with his young daughter Lotte by T-Force. They are taken to Great Britain and detained, where Captain Callum Ferguson is assigned the task of getting Koehler to co-operate with the British government. Ferguson is pressured to get results quickly, while Koehler resists his efforts, resentful of the treatment he and Lotte receive. Encountering various other characters in and around the Connington Hotel, Callum wrestles with the ethics of his mission as London society slowly rebuilds.

Cast
 Jim Sturgess as Captain Callum Ferguson
 Freddie Highmore as Victor Ferguson
 Charlotte Riley as Rachel Lombard
 Phoebe Fox as Kathy Griffiths
 Alfred Molina as Harold Lindsay-Jones
 Ciara Charteris as Lucy Lindsay-Jones
 Lindsay Duncan as Frau Bellinghausen
 Alfie Allen as Ringwood
 Angela Bassett as Eva
 Robert Glenister as Brigadier Wainwright
 August Diehl as Dieter Koehler
 Antje Traue as Bergit Mentz
 Lucy Ward as Lotte Koehler
 Sebastian Armesto as Alex Lombard
 Julian Bleach as Geoffrey Slater
 Charity Wakefield as Julia
 Aleksandar Jovanovic as Horst Kleinow
 Andrew Price as Maître D'

Episodes

Production
The Stephen Poliakoff-created seven-part series was announced by BBC Two in March 2015, along with an all-star cast consisting of Jim Sturgess, Freddie Highmore, Charlotte Riley, Phoebe Fox, Alfred Molina, Lindsay Duncan, Robert Glenister, August Diehl, Antje Traue, Angela Bassett and Alfie Allen. The series was acquired for the United States by Starz in September 2015.

Principal photography began in Liverpool in March 2015 with Martins Bank Building, Croxteth Hall, the Adelphi Hotel being amongst some of the locations utilised. Filming also took place at the ruins of Witley Court, Worcestershire, the University of Salford, Salford Museum and Art Gallery, Manchester Town Hall, Capesthorne Hall, London and Kent at The Historic Dockyard Chatham.

An accompanying interview with the writer, titled Know Your Enemy - Stephen Poliakoff in Conversation, was broadcast on 1 December 2016.

References

External links
 
 
 Close to the Enemy, Close to the Truth? at the University of Kent

2016 British television series debuts
2016 British television series endings
2010s British drama television series
2010s British television miniseries
BBC television dramas
English-language television shows
Television series set in the 1940s
Films directed by Stephen Poliakoff
Television shows set in England
Television shows set in London
Television series by All3Media
Television shows shot in Liverpool